Saratxo is a hamlet and council located in the municipality of Amurrio, in Álava province, Basque Country, Spain. As of 2020, it has a population of 90.

Geography 
Saratxo is located 44 km northwest of Vitoria-Gasteiz.

References

Populated places in Álava